Henrique Ribeiro Marques Barbosa (born July 5, 1984) is an international swimmer from Brazil.

Barbosa was born in Belo Horizonte. He has a degree in International relations from the University of California, Berkeley.  Inn 2008 Henrique Barbosa was living in Florida, dedicated solely to swimming. Shared a house with three other swimmers, as a member of "The Race Club", running club created by American Olympic champion Gary Hall Jr. In the Esporte Clube Pinheiros since 2007, he has gone through teams like Flamengo and Minas.

Early years 

At 8 years old, he practiced judo and volleyball, besides swimming, and just devoted himself exclusively to swim at age 12. At 15, he won his first podium in Brazil Trophy.

International career 

At 18 years old, at the 2002 Pan Pacific Swimming Championships in Yokohama, Barbosa finished 5th in the 4×100-metre medley, 9th in the 100-metre breaststroke, and 12th in the 200-metre breaststroke.

In the 2003 World Aquatics Championships in Barcelona, finishing 35th in the 100-metre breaststroke.  He participated at the 2003 Pan American Games, in Santo Domingo, where he finished 5th in the 100-metre breaststroke.

At the 2004 FINA World Swimming Championships (25 m), in Indianapolis, Barbosa finished 7th in the 100-metre breaststroke final, 14th in the 50-metre breaststroke, 16th in the 200-metre breaststroke, and helped the Brazilian 4×100-metre medley relay team to reach the finals.

At the 2006 Pan Pacific Swimming Championships in Victoria, where he finished 7th in the 4×100-metre medley, 8th in the 100-metre breaststroke, and 12th in the 200-metre breaststroke.

At the 2007 World Aquatics Championships, in Melbourne, where he finished 25th in the 50-metre breaststroke, 23rd in the 100-metre breaststroke, 33rd in the 200-metre breaststroke  and 9th in the 4×100-metre medley.  At the 2007 Pan American Games, in Rio de Janeiro, Barbosa won two silver medals in the 200-metre breaststroke, and in the 4×100-metre medley, where he broke the South American record with a time of 3:35.81, along with Thiago Pereira, Kaio Almeida and César Cielo. He also finished 4th in the 100-metre breaststroke. In the 100-metre breaststroke semifinal, Henrique broke the South American record, with a time of 1:01.47.

He was at the 2008 Summer Olympics, where he finished 23rd in the 100-metre breaststroke, and 30th in the 200-metre breaststroke.

On May 6, 2009, at the Maria Lenk Aquatic Center, Henrique Barbosa swam the 2nd best time in the history of the 200-metre breaststroke: 2:08.44. On May 9, 2009 he swam the 2nd fastest time in history in the 100-metre breaststroke, 59.12 seconds, lowering the time in the end of the next day to 59.03 seconds. Both world records belonged to Kosuke Kitajima (58.91 seconds in the 100-metre, and 2:07.51 in the 200-metre breaststroke).

Barbosa was at the 2009 World Aquatics Championships, in Rome, where he came 8th place in the 100-metre breaststroke, 7th in the 200-metre breaststroke, and 4th place in the 4×100-metre medley with the Brazilian team, in a spectacular race where the top four relay teams broke the world record of the United States from Beijing 2008.

On November 14, 2009, at the FINA World Cup, Barbosa broke the short-course South American record in the 200-metre breaststroke, with a time of 2:04.35.

He was at the 2010 Pan Pacific Swimming Championships in Irvine, where he finished 8th in the 200-metre breaststroke, classified 14th in the 100-metre breaststroke, but did not swim the final, and classified 13th in the 50-metre breaststroke, but did not swim the final, too.

He was at the 2010 FINA World Swimming Championships (25 m), in Dubai, where he won a bronze medal in the 4×100-metre medley, for having swum the qualifying heats. He also was disqualified in 100-metre breaststroke heats.

In 2011, Barbosa was one of four swimmers from Brazil caught in doping test by the use of the banned substance furosemide. The Court of Arbitration for Sport (CAS) found that Barbosa was not guilty in the case and decided to just keep the warning already stipulated by the CBDA (Brazilian Aquatic Sports Confederation).

At the 2012 Summer Olympics, he competed in the Men's 200-metre breaststroke, finishing in 19th place overall in the heats, failing to qualify for the semifinals.

References

Brazilian male breaststroke swimmers
1984 births
Living people
Olympic swimmers of Brazil
Swimmers at the 2003 Pan American Games
Swimmers at the 2007 Pan American Games
Swimmers at the 2008 Summer Olympics
Swimmers at the 2012 Summer Olympics
Pan American Games silver medalists for Brazil
Pan American Games medalists in swimming
South American Games gold medalists for Brazil
South American Games medalists in swimming
Competitors at the 2014 South American Games
Medalists at the 2007 Pan American Games
Sportspeople from Belo Horizonte
California Golden Bears men's swimmers